SEIU 1199 WKO is a local of the Service Employees International Union, SEIU representing Health Care and Social Service Workers in West Virginia, Kentucky, and Ohio. Before merging with SEIU 1199 WKO was part of 1199: The National Health Care Workers' Union.

External links
 SEIU 1199 WKO

Service Employees International Union
Trade unions in Ohio
Trade unions in Kentucky
Trade unions in West Virginia